Jeremiah Anderson may refer to:

Jeremiah Anderson (curling) in 2009 Molson Scotia Cup
Jeremiah Anderson (abolitionist), see Shields Green
Jeremiah Anderson (politician) in  48th New York State Legislature

See also
Jerry Anderson (disambiguation)